This is a list of ambassadors of the United States to Burkina Faso (formerly Upper Volta).

Until 1960 Upper Volta was a French possession as a part of French West Africa. In 1958 Upper Volta became an autonomous republic in the French Community (Communauté française), and achieved independence as the Republic of Upper Volta on August 5, 1960.

The United States recognized Upper Volta immediately and assigned its first envoy on the nation's independence day, August 5. The envoy, Donald R. Norland, had presented his credentials as Chargé d'Affaires ad interim on the previous day, August 4, to take effect on the day of independence. Norland was also the Chargé d'Affaires a.i. to the newly independent nations: Ivory Coast (Côte d'Ivoire), Dahomey (Benin) and Niger while resident in Abidjan.

The first ranking ambassador, R. Borden Reams, was appointed October 17, 1960. He was also the ambassador to the aforementioned countries while resident in Abidjan. On December 31, 1960, an embassy was established in Ouagadougou with a resident Chargé d'affaires. On May 29, 1961, the first ambassador solely accredited to Upper Volta was appointed.

On August 4, 1984, the nation's name was changed to Burkina Faso.

The United States Embassy in Burkina Faso is located in Ouagadougou.

Ambassadors

Notes

See also
Ambassadors to Burkina Faso
Burkina Faso – United States relations
Foreign relations of Burkina Faso
Ambassadors of the United States

References
United States Department of State: Background notes on Burkina Faso

External links
United States Department of State: Chiefs of Mission for Burkina Faso
 United States Department of State: Burkina Faso
 United States Embassy in Ouagadougou

Burkina Faso

United States